The Montserrat Championship is the top association football division in Montserrat. It was created in 1974 but has been competed-for only sporadically since then, partially as a result of the Soufrière Hills eruption causing widespread devastation to the island in 1997. Between 2005 and 2015, no league was played in this country at all. The league restarted in 2016, but has not been played since 2018.

History
Football was first brought to Montserrat during World War 2 and grew in popularity during the 1960s and 1970s at which time the championship and Football Association were established, The first iteration of the national championship was held in 1974 and was won by the Police. A second season was played the following year, won by Bata Falcons, but following that there are no records of any form of organized competition until 1995, when the Police team again won the championship. Just as organized football on Montserrat was beginning to get going, a major eruption of the Soufrière Hills volcano caused widespread destruction of large parts of the island, with many villages being abandoned. As a result, the 1996–97 season was abandoned part way through and no formal competition was held on the island until 2000, when the competition was again won by the police team. Further competitions were held each year until 2004, when Ideal became only the third team to win the championship in its history. This was the last recorded season of formal competition on the island until 2016 when the competition occurred again.

Current clubs
Source:

Most league games took place at the 1,000-capacity Blakes Estate Stadium.

 Bata Falcons
Elberton
Ideal
 Jolly Roger
 Little Bay
 Montserrat Volcano Observatory Tremors
P.C. United FC
 Royal Montserrat Police Force
 Seven Day Adventists Trendsetters
 St. John's

Previous clubs 

Montserrat Secondary School
Salem FC

Previous winners

Topscorers

2016 champions

References

Montserrat Championship
Football competitions in Montserrat
Top level football leagues in the Caribbean
Sports leagues established in 1974
1974 establishments in Montserrat